The Bornean barbet (Psilopogon eximius) is a species of bird in the Megalaimidae family. It is found in Indonesia and Malaysia where it is endemic to the island of Borneo. Its natural habitats are subtropical or tropical moist lowland forests and subtropical or tropical moist montane forests.

References

Psilopogon
Endemic birds of Borneo
Birds described in 1892
Fauna of the Borneo montane rain forests
Taxonomy articles created by Polbot